Moskovsky Settlement is a settlement (both municipal and administrative unit in Moscow) in Novomoskovsky Administrative Okrug of Moscow. It was established in 2005 as Moskovsky urban settlement in Leninsky municipal raion of Moscow Oblast and now it consists of the town of Moskovsky and eight other inhabited localities of the abolished Moskovsky rural district. On July 1, 2012 Moskovsky Settlement was transferred to the city of Moscow and became a part of Novomoskovsky Administrative Okrug.

Inhabited localities 
The structure of the settlement includes nine inhabited localities:

References

External links

 Website of administration of Moskovsky Settlement

 
Novomoskovsky Administrative Okrug
Settlements of Moscow